This is a list of diseases starting with the letter "P".

Pa

Pac–Pal
 Pachydermoperiostosis
 Pachygyria
 Pachyonychia congenita Jackson–Lawler type
 Pacman dysplasia
 Paes–Whelan–Modi syndrome
 Paget disease extramammary
 Paget disease juvenile type
 Paget's disease of bone
 Paget's disease of the breast
 Paget's disease, type 1
 Pagon–Bird–Detter syndrome
 Pagon–Stephan syndrome
 Pai–Levkoff syndrome
 Palant cleft palate syndrome
 Palindromic rheumatism
 Pallister–Hall syndrome
 Pallister–Killian syndrome
 Palmer–Pagon syndrome
 Palmitoyl-protein thioesterase deficiency
 Palmoplantar Keratoderma
 Palmoplantar porokeratosis of Mantoux
 Palsy cerebral

Pan
 Panayiotopoulos syndrome
 Pancreas agenesis
 Pancreas divisum
 Pancreatic adenoma
 Pancreatic beta cell agenesis with neonatal diabetes mellitus
 Pancreatic cancer
 Pancreatic carcinoma, familial
 Pancreatic diseases
 Pancreatic islet cell neoplasm
 Pancreatic islet cell tumors
 Pancreatic lipomatosis duodenal stenosis
 Pancreatitis, hereditary
 Pancreatoblastoma
 Panhypopituitarism
 Panic disorder
 Panmyelophthisis aplastic anemia
 Panniculitis
 Panophobia
 Panostotic fibrous dysplasia
 Panthophobia

Pap
 Papilledema
 Papillon–Lefèvre syndrome
 Papillitis of the lingual papillae
 Papillitis of the optic nerve
 Papilloma of choroid plexus
 Papular mucinosis
 Papular urticaria

Par

Para–Pari
 Paracoccidioidomycosis
 Paraganglioma
 Parainfluenza virus type 3 antenatal infection
 Paramyotonia congenita of von Eulenburg
 Paramyotonia congenita
 Paraneoplastic cerebellar degeneration
 Paranoid personality disorder
 Paraomphalocele
 Paraparesis amyotrophy of hands and feet
 Paraphilia
 Paraplegia
 Paraplegia-brachydactyly-cone shaped epiphysis
 Paraplegia-mental retardation-hyperkeratosis
 Parapsoriasis
 Parasitophobia
 Parastremmatic dwarfism
 Parathyroid cancer
 Parathyroid neoplasm
 Paratyphoid fever
 PARC syndrome
 Parenchymatous cortical degeneration of cerebellum
 Paris-Trousseau thrombopenia

Park–Parv
 Parkes Weber syndrome
 Parkinson's disease
 Parkinson dementia Steele type
 Parkinsonism early onset mental retardation
 Parkinsonism
 Paronychia
 Paroxysmal cold hemoglobinuria
 Paroxysmal dystonic choreoathetosis
 Paroxysmal nocturnal hemoglobinuria
 Paroxysmal ventricular fibrillation
 Parry–Romberg syndrome
 Pars planitis
 Parsonage–Turner syndrome
 Partial agenesis of corpus callosum
 Partial atrioventricular canal
 Partial deletion of Y
 Partial gigantism in context of NF
 Partial lissencephaly
 Partington–Anderson syndrome
 Partington–Mulley syndrome
 Parturiphobia
 Paruresis
 Parvovirus antenatal infection

Pas–Pat
 Pascuel–Castroviejo syndrome
 Pashayan syndrome
 Passive-aggressive personality disorder
 Patau syndrome
 Patel–Bixler syndrome
 Patella aplasia, coxa vara, tarsal synostosis
 Patella hypoplasia mental retardation
 Patent ductus arteriosus familial
 Patent ductus arteriosus
 Patterson–Lowry syndrome
 Patterson pseudoleprechaunism syndrome
 Patterson–Stevenson syndrome

Pau–Pav
 Pauciarticular chronic arthritis
 Pavone–Fiumara–Rizzo syndrome

Pe

Pea–Pem
 Peanut hypersensitivity
 Pearson's marrow/pancreas syndrome
 Pediatric T-cell leukemia
 Pediculosis
 Peeling skin syndrome ichthyosis
 PEHO syndrome
 Pelizaeus–Merzbacher brain sclerosis
 Pelizaeus–Merzbacher disease, recessive, acute infantile
 Pelizaeus–Merzbacher disease
 Pelizaeus–Merzbacher leukodystrophy
 Pellagra
 Pellagra like syndrome
 Pellagrophobia
 Pelvic dysplasia arthrogryposis of lower limbs
 Pelvic inflammatory disease
 Pelvic lipomatosis
 Pelvic shoulder dysplasia
 Pemphigus and fogo selvagem
 Pemphigus foliaceus
 Pemphigus vulgaris, familial
 Pemphigus vulgaris
 Pemphigus

Pen–Pep
 Pena–Shokeir syndrome
 Pendred syndrome
 Penile agenesis
 Penoscrotal transposition
 Penta X syndrome
 Pentalogy of Cantrell
 Pentosuria
 Penttinen–Aula syndrome
 PEPCK 1 deficiency
 PEPCK 2 deficiency
 PEPCK deficiency, mitochondrial
 Peptidic growth factors deficiency

Per
 Perceptual disorder

Peri
 Periarteritis nodosa
 Pericardial constriction with growth failure
 Pericardial defect diaphragmatic hernia
 Pericardium absent mental retardation short stature
 Pericardium congenital anomaly
 Perilymphatic fistula
 Perimyositis
 Perinatal infections
 Periodic disease
 Periodic fever, aphthous stomatitis, pharyngitis and adenitis
 Periodic limb movement disorder
 Periodontal disease / Periodontitis
 Perioral dermatitis
 Peripartum cardiomyopathy
 Peripheral blood vessel disorder
 Peripheral nervous disorder
 Peripheral neuroectodermal tumor
 Peripheral neuropathy
 Peripheral T-cell lymphoma
 Peripheral type neurofibromatosis
 Perisylvian syndrome
 Peritonitis
 Periventricular laminar heterotopia
 Periventricular leukomalacia

Pern–Pert
 Pernicious anemia
 Perniola–Krajewska–Carnevale syndrome
 Perniosis
 Peroxisomal Bifunctional Enzyme Deficiency
 Peroxisomal defects
 Persistent Müllerian duct syndrome
 Persistent parvovirus infection
 Persistent sexual arousal syndrome
 Persistent truncus arteriosus
 Pertussis

Pes–Pey
 Pes planus
 Peters anomaly with cataract
 Peters anomaly
 Peters congenital glaucoma
 Petit–Fryns syndrome
 Petty–Laxova–Wiedemann syndrome
 Peutz–Jeghers syndrome
 Peyronie disease

Pf
 Pfeiffer cardiocranial syndrome
 Pfeiffer–Hirschfelder–Rott syndrome
 Pfeiffer–Kapferer syndrome
 Pfeiffer–Mayer syndrome
 Pfeiffer–Palm–Teller syndrome
 Pfeiffer–Rockelein syndrome
 Pfeiffer–Singer–Zschiesche syndrome
 Pfeiffer syndrome
 Pfeiffer–Tietze–Welte syndrome
 Pfeiffer type acrocephalosyndactyly

Ph

Pha–Phi
 PHACE association
 Phacomatosis fourth
 Phacomatosis pigmentokeratotica
 Phacomatosis pigmentovascularis
 Phalacrophobia
 Pharmacophobia
 Pharyngitis
 Phenobarbital antenatal infection
 Phenobarbital embryopathy
 Phenol sulfotransferase deficiency
 Phenothiazine antenatal infection
 Phenylalanine hydroxylase deficiency
 Phenylalaninemia
 Phenylketonuria type II
 Phenylketonuria
 Phenylketonuric embryopathy
 Pheochromocytoma as part of NF
 Pheochromocytoma
 Philadelphia-negative chronic myeloid leukemia

Pho–Pht
 Phocomelia contractures absent thumb
 Phocomelia ectrodactyly deafness sinus arrhythmia
 Phocomelia Schinzel type
 Phocomelia syndrome
 Phocomelia thrombocytopenia encephalocele
 Phosphate diabetes
 Phosphoenolpyruvate carboxykinase 1 deficiency
 Phosphoenolpyruvate carboxykinase 2 deficiency
 Phosphoenolpyruvate carboxykinase deficiency
 Phosphoglucomutase deficiency type 1
 Phosphoglucomutase deficiency type 2
 Phosphoglucomutase deficiency type 3
 Phosphoglucomutase deficiency type 4
 Phosphoglucomutase deficiency
 Phosphoglycerate kinase 1 deficiency
 Phosphoglycerate kinase deficiency
 Phosphomannoisomerase deficiency
 Phosphoribosylpyrophosphate synthetase deficiency
 Photoaugliaphobia
 Photosensitive epilepsy
 Phthiriophobia

Phy
 Physical urticaria
 Phytanic acid oxidase deficiency
 Phytophotodermatitis

Pi

Pib–Pig
 PIBI(D)S syndrome
 Pica
 Picardi–Lassueur–Little syndrome
 Pick disease
 Pickardt syndrome
 Pie Torcido
 Piebald trait neurologic defects
 Piebaldism
 Piepkorn–Karp–Hickoc syndrome
 Pierre Marie cerebellar ataxia
 Pierre Robin sequence
 Pigmentary retinopathy
 Pigment dispersion syndrome
 Pigmented villonodular synovitis
 Pignata guarino syndrome

Pil–Piu
 Pili canulati
 Pili multigemini
 Pili torti developmental delay neurological abnormalities
 Pili torti nerve deafness
 Pili torti onychodysplasia
 Pili torti
 Pillay syndrome
 Pilo dento ungular dysplasia microcephaly
 Pilonidal cyst
 Pilotto syndrome
 Pinealoma
 Pinheiro–Freire–Maia–Miranda syndrome
 Pinsky–Di George–Harley syndrome
 Pinta
 Pipecolic acidemia
 PIRA
 Pitt–Hopkins syndrome
 Pitt–Rogers–Danks syndrome
 Pituitary dwarfism 1
 Pityriasis lichenoides chronica
 Pityriasis lichenoides et varioliformis acuta
 Pityriasis rubra pilaris
 Piussan–Lenaerts–Mathieu syndrome

Pl–Pn
 Placenta disorder
 Placenta neoplasm
 Placental abruption
 Plagiocephaly X linked mental retardation
 Plague 
 Plague, bubonic
 Plague, meningeal
 Plague, pharyngeal
 Plague, pneumonic
 Plague, septicemic
 Plasmacytoma anaplastic
 Plasmalogenes synthesis deficiency isolated
 Plasminogen activator inhibitor type 1 deficiency, congenital
 Plasminogen deficiency, congenital
 Platelet disorder
 Platyspondylic lethal chondrodysplasia
 Platyspondyly amelogenesis imperfecta
 Pleural effusion
 Pleuritis
 Pleuritis
 Plexosarcoma
 Plummer–Vinson syndrome
 Pneumoconiosis
 Pneumocystis jiroveci pneumonia
 Pneumocystosis
 Pneumonia
 Pneumonia, eosinophilic
 Pneumonoultramicroscopicsilicovolcanoconiosis
 Pneumothorax

Po

Pod–Poi
 Podder-Tolmie syndrome
 POEMS syndrome
 Poedimus kyleopecia mental retardation
 Poikiloderma congenital with bullae Weary type
 Poikiloderma hereditary acrokeratotic Weary type
 Poikiloderma of Kindler
 Poikiloderma of Rothmund–Thomson
 Poikilodermatomyositis mental retardation
 Poikilodermia alopecia retrognathism cleft palate
 Pointer syndrome

Pol

Pola–Poli
 Poland syndrome
 Poliomyelitis (Polio)
 Poliosophobia

Poly

Polya–Polyc
 Polyarteritis nodosa
 Polyarteritis
 Polyarthritis, systemic
 Polyarthritis
 Polychondritis
 Polycystic kidney disease, adult type
 Polycystic kidney disease, infantile type
 Polycystic kidney disease, infantile, type I
 Polycystic kidney disease, recessive type
 Polycystic kidney disease, type 1
 Polycystic kidney disease, type 2
 Polycystic kidney disease, type 3
 Polycystic kidney disease
 Polycystic ovarian disease, familial
 Polycystic ovarian syndrome
 Polycystic ovaries urethral sphincter dysfunction
 Polycythemia vera

Polyd–Polyo
 Polydactyly alopecia seborrheic dermatitis
 Polydactyly cleft lip palate psychomotor retardation
 Polydactyly myopia syndrome
 Polydactyly postaxial dental and vertebral
 Polydactyly postaxial with median cleft of upper lip
 Polydactyly postaxial
 Polydactyly preaxial type 1
 Polydactyly syndrome middle ray duplication
 Polydactyly visceral anomalies cleft lip palate
 Polydactyly
 Polyglucosan body disease, adult
 Polymicrogyria turricephaly hypogenitalism
 Polymorphic catecholergic ventricular tachycardia
 Polymorphic macular degeneration
 Polymorphous low-grade adenocarcinoma
 Polymyalgia rheumatica
 Polymyositis
 Polyneuritis
 Polyneuropathy hand defect
 Polyneuropathy mental retardation acromicria prema
 Polyomavirus Infections
 Polyostotic fibrous dysplasia

Polyp–Polys
 Polyposis, hamartomatous intestinal
 Polyposis skin pigmentation alopecia fingernail changes
 Polysyndactyly cardiac malformation
 Polysyndactyly microcephaly ptosis
 Polysyndactyly orofacial anomalies
 Polysyndactyly overgrowth syndrome
 Polysyndactyly trigonocephaly agenesis of corpus callosum
 Polysyndactyly type 4
 Polysyndactyly type Haas

Pom–Por
 Pompe's disease
 Poncet–Spiegler's cylindroma
 Pontoneocerebellar Hypoplasia
 Popliteal pterygium syndrome lethal type
 Popliteal pterygium syndrome
 Porencephaly cerebellar hypoplasia malformations
 Porencephaly
 Porokeratosis of Mibelli
 Porokeratosis plantaris palmaris et disseminata
 Porokeratosis punctata palmaris et plantaris
 Porphyria
 Porphyria cutanea tarda, familial type
 Porphyria cutanea tarda, sporadic type
 Porphyria cutanea tarda
 Porphyria, acute intermittent
 Porphyria, Ala-D
 Porphyria, congenital erythropoietic
 Porphyria, hereditary coproporphyria
 Portal hypertension due to infrahepatic block
 Portal hypertension
 Portal thrombosis
 Portal vein thrombosis
 Portuguese type amyloidosis

Pos–Pox
 Positive rheumatoid factor polyarthritis
 Post-polio syndrome
 Post Traumatic Stress disorder (PTSD)
 Postaxial polydactyly mental retardation
 Posterior tibial tendon rupture
 Posterior urethral valves
 Posterior uveitis
 Posterior valve urethra
 Post-infectious myocarditis
 Post-partum depression
 Post-SSRI sexual dysfunction
 Post-traumatic epilepsy
 Postural hypotension
 Potassium aggravated myotonia
 Potassium deficiency (hypokalemia)
 Potter disease type 1
 Potter disease, type 3
 Potter sequence cleft cardiopathy
 Potter syndrome dominant type
 Powell–Buist–Stenzel syndrome
 Powell–Chandra–Saal syndrome
 Powell–Venencie–Gordon syndrome
 Poxviridae disease

Pr

Pra–Pre
 Prader–Willi syndrome
 Prata–Liberal–Goncalves syndrome
 Preaxial deficiency postaxial polydactyly hypospadia
 Preaxial polydactyly colobomata mental retardation
 Precocious epileptic encephalopathy
 Precocious myoclonic encephalopathy
 Precocious puberty
 Precocious puberty, gonadotropin-dependent
 Precocious puberty, male limited
 Preeclampsia
 Preeyasombat Viravithya syndrome
 Pregnancy toxemia /hypertension
 Prekallikrein deficiency, congenital
 Premature aging, Okamoto type
 Premature aging
 Premature atherosclerosis photomyoclonic epilepsy
 Premature menopause, familial
 Premature ovarian failure
 Premenstrual dysphoric disorder
 Prenatal infections
 Presbycusis
 Presbyopia

Pri
 Prieto–Badia–Mulas syndrome
 Prieur–Griscelli syndrome
 Primary agammaglobulinemia
 Primary aldosteronism
 Primary alveolar hypoventilation
 Primary amenorrhea
 Primary biliary cirrhosis
 Primary ciliary dyskinesia, 2
 Primary ciliary dyskinesia
 Primary craniosynostosis
 Primary cutaneous amyloidosis
 Primary granulocytic sarcoma
 Primary hyperoxaluria
 Primary hyperparathyroidism
 Primary lateral sclerosis
 Primary malignant lymphoma
 Primary muscular atrophy
 Primary orthostatic tremor
 Primary progressive aphasia
 Primary pulmonary hypertension
 Primary sclerosing cholangitis
 Primary tubular proximal acidosis
 Primerose syndrome
 Primordial microcephalic dwarfism Crachami type
 Prinzmetal's variant angina

Pro

Proc
 Procarcinoma
 Processing disorder
 Proconvertin deficiency, congenital
 Procrastination
 Proctitis

Prog
 Progeria short stature pigmented nevi
 Progeria variant syndrome Ruvalcaba type
 Progeria
 Progeroid syndrome De Barsy type
 Progeroid syndrome Petty type
 Progeroid syndrome, Penttinen type
 Prognathism dominant
 Progressive acromelanosis
 Progressive black carbon hyperpigmentation of infancy
 Progressive diaphyseal dysplasia
 Progressive external ophthalmoplegia
 Progressive hearing loss stapes fixation
 Progressive kinking of the hair, acquired
 Progressive multifocal leukoencephalopathy
 Progressive myositis ossificans
 Progressive osseous heteroplasia
 Progressive spinal muscular atrophy
 Progressive supranuclear palsy atypical
 Progressive supranuclear palsy
 Progressive systemic sclerosis

Prol–Prou
 Prolactinoma, familial
 Proliferating trichilemmal cyst
 Prolidase deficiency
 Prolymphocytic leukemia
 Properdin deficiency
 Prosencephaly cerebellar dysgenesis
 Prosopamnesia
 Prostaglandin antenatal infection
 Prostate cancer, familial
 Prostatic malacoplakia associated with prostatic abscess
 Prostatitis
 Protein C deficiency
 Protein–energy malnutrition
 Protein R deficiency
 Protein S acquired deficiency
 Protein S deficiency
 Proteus like syndrome mental retardation eye defect
 Proteus syndrome
 Prothrombin deficiency
 Protoporphyria, erythropoietic
 Protoporphyria
 Proud–Levine–Carpenter syndrome

Prox
 Proximal myotonic dystrophy
 Proximal myotonic myopathy
 Proximal spinal muscular atrophy
 Proximal tubulopathy diabetes mellitus cerebellar ataxia

Pru
 Prune belly syndrome
 Prurigo nodularis

Ps

Pse

Psel
 Psellismophobia

Pseu

Pseud

Pseudo
Pseudoa–Pseudom
 Pseudoachondroplasia
 Pseudoachondroplastic dysplasia 1
 Pseudoachondroplastic dysplasia
 Pseudoadrenoleukodystrophy
 Pseudoaminopterin syndrome
 Pseudoarylsulfatase A deficiency
 Pseudocholinesterase deficiency
 Pseudo-Gaucher disease
 Pseudogout
 Pseudohermaphrodism anorectal anomalies;  see Anorectal malformation
 Pseudohermaphroditism female skeletal anomalies
 Pseudohermaphroditism male with gynecomastia
 Pseudohermaphroditism mental retardation
 Pseudohermaphroditism
 Pseudohypoaldosteronism type 1
 Pseudohypoaldosteronism type 2
 Pseudohypoaldosteronism
 Pseudohypoparathyroidism
 Pseudomarfanism
 Pseudomonas infection
 Pseudomonas aeruginosa infection
 Pseudomonas oryzihabitans infection
 Pseudomonas stutzeri infection
 Pseudomongolism
 Pseudomyxoma peritonei
Pseudoo–Pseudo-Z
 Pseudoobstruction idiopathic intestinal
 Pseudopapilledema
 Pseudopapilledema blepharophimosis hand anomalies
 Pseudopelade of Brocq
 Pseudopolycythaemia
 Pseudoprogeria syndrome
 Pseudo-torch syndrome
 Pseudotumor cerebri
 Pseudo-Turner syndrome
 Pseudovaginal perineoscrotal hypospadias
 Pseudoxanthoma elasticum, dominant form
 Pseudoxanthoma elasticum, recessive form
 Pseudoxanthoma elasticum
 Pseudo-Zellweger syndrome

Psi–Psy
 Psittacosis
 Psoriasis
 Psoriatic arthritis
 Psoriatic rheumatism
 Psychogenic polydipsia
 Psychophysiologic disorders
 Psychosis

Pt
 Pterygia mental retardation facial dysmorphism
 Pterygium colli
 Pterygium colli mental retardation digital anomalies
 Pterygium of the eye
 Pterygium syndrome antecubital
 Pterygium syndrome multiple dominant type
 Pterygium syndrome X linked
 Pterygium syndrome, multiple
 Ptosis
 Ptosis coloboma mental retardation
 Ptosis coloboma trigonocephaly
 Ptosis strabismus diastasis
 Ptosis strabismus ectopic pupils

Pu

Pub
 Pubic lice
 Puerperal fever

Pul

Pulm

Pulmo

Pulmon
 Pulmonar arterioveinous aneurysm
 Pulmonary agenesis
 Pulmonary alveolar proteinosis, congenital
 Pulmonary alveolar proteinosis
 Pulmonary arterio-veinous fistula
 Pulmonary artery agenesis
 Pulmonary artery coming from the aorta
 Pulmonary artery familial dilatation
 Pulmonary atresia with ventricular septal defect
 Pulmonary blastoma
 Pulmonary branches stenosis
 Pulmonary cystic lymphangiectasis
 Pulmonary disease, chronic obstructive
 Pulmonary edema of mountaineers
 Pulmonary fibrosis /granuloma
 Pulmonary hypertension, secondary
 Pulmonary hypertension
 Pulmonary hypoplasia familial primary
 Pulmonary sequestration
 Pulmonary supravalvular stenosis
 Pulmonary surfactant protein B, deficiency of
 Pulmonary valve stenosis
 Pulmonary valves agenesis
 Pulmonary veins stenosis
 Pulmonary veno-occlusive disease
 Pulmonary venous return anomaly
 Pulmonaryatresia intact ventricular septum
 Pulmonic stenosis with Café au lait spot

Pun–Pur
 Punctate acrokeratoderma freckle like pigmentation
 Punctate inner choroidopathy
 Pure red cell aplasia
 Puretic syndrome
 Purine nucleoside phosphorylase deficiency
 Purpura, Schönlein–Henoch
 Purpura, thrombotic thrombocytopenic
 Purpura
 Purtilo syndrome

Py
 Pyaemia
 Pycnodysostosis
 Pyknoachondrogenesis
 Pyle disease
 Pyelonephritis
 Pyoderma gangrenosum
 Pyomyositis
 Pyridoxine deficit
 Pyrimidinemia familial
 Pyrophobia
 Pyropoikilocytosis
 Pyrosis
 Pyruvate carboxylase deficiency
 Pyruvate decarboxylase deficiency
 Pyruvate dehydrogenase deficiency
 Pyruvate kinase deficiency, liver type
 Pyruvate kinase deficiency, muscle type
 Pyruvate kinase deficiency

P